Dhofar Liberation Front (DLF) was a communist front that was established to create a separatist state in Dhofar, the southern province of Oman, which shared a border with South Yemen.

The DLF was established by communist (Marxist–Leninist) youth in Salalah in 1965. Its main aim was to secure funding for the development of the area and to end the rule of the Sultan of Muscat and Oman (Said bin Taimur).

The two leadership characters that would be at the core of the front's short history were Musallam bin Nufl and Yusuf bin Alawi bin Abdullah.

They, being supported by South Yemen, fought a 10-year insurgency against the Sultan of Muscat and Oman's Armed Forces. The Sultanate Army, supported by Iran and the United Kingdom, managed to remove the DLF and to push its forces towards the border of Yemen and the mountains in 1976.

References

1965 establishments in Oman
1968 disestablishments in Oman
Arab nationalism in Oman
Arab nationalist militant groups
Arab Nationalist Movement
Arab socialist organizations
Communism in Oman
Communism in Yemen
Defunct communist militant groups
Dhofar Rebellion
National liberation movements
Organizations disestablished in 1968
Organizations established in 1965